Josef Danek is an Austrian retired slalom canoeist who competed from the late 1940s to the mid-1960s. He won a silver medal in the folding K-1 team event at the 1949 ICF Canoe Slalom World Championships in Geneva.

References

Austrian male canoeists
Possibly living people
Year of birth missing
Medalists at the ICF Canoe Slalom World Championships